Wesley L. Harris is an American physicist currently the C.S. Draper Professor of Aeronautics and Astronautics at Massachusetts Institute of Technology and has been awarded honorary doctorates by Milwaukee School of Engineering, Lane College and Old Dominion University.

Harris was elected a member of the National Academy of Engineering in 1995 for contributions to understanding of helicopter rotor noise, for encouragement of minorities in engineering, and for service to the aeronautical industry.

References

Year of birth missing (living people)
Living people
MIT School of Engineering faculty
21st-century American physicists